Dacryotrichia is a monotypic genus of flowering plants in the family Asteraceae, containing the single species Dacryotrichia robinsonii. It is endemic to the Republic of Zambia in Africa.

References

Monotypic Asteraceae genera
Astereae
Flora of Zambia